Rahajärvi (also: Raahajärvi) is a medium-sized lake in the Paatsjoki main catchment area. It is located in the municipality of Inari in the region Lapland in Finland. The lake has major and minor part. It is situated near the Finnish National Road 4.

See also
List of lakes in Finland

References

Lakes of Inari, Finland